Pölöskefő is a village in Zala County, Hungary.

Notable residents
Ferenc Mező, poet & Olympic gold medalist

References

Populated places in Zala County